Archana Suseendran (born 9 June 1994) is an Indian athlete who specializes in the sprint. She represented India at the 2019 World Athletics Championships, competing in women's 200 metres. She did not advance to compete in the semi-finals.

She won Gold medal in South Asian Games 2019 in 100 meter women's race with timing of 11.80 second, defeating Amasha De Silva of Sri Lanka.

Personal bests

References

Indian female sprinters
1994 births
Living people
World Athletics Championships athletes for India
Athletes from Tamil Nadu